The Bobcaygeon Formation is a geologic formation in Ontario. It preserves fossils dating back to the Ordovician period.

See also

 List of fossiliferous stratigraphic units in Ontario

References
 

Ordovician Ontario
Ordovician southern paleotemperate deposits
Ordovician southern paleotropical deposits